The Volvo C30 is a three-door, front-engine, front-wheel-drive premium compact hatchback, manufactured and marketed by Volvo Cars from 2006 to 2013, in a single generation. Powered by inline-four and straight-five engines, the C30 is variant of the Volvo S40/V50/C70 range, sharing the same Ford C1/Volvo P1 platform. Volvo marketed the C30 as a premium hatchback / sports coupe.

The C30's rear styling and frameless glass rear hatch recall Volvo's earlier P1800 ES and Volvo 480.

Pre-production concepts

Volvo SCC (2001)
The Volvo SCC (Safety Concept Car) is a concept vehicle incorporating the rear hatch design from Volvo P1800ES and the glass hatch from Volvo 480ES.

Safety features include:
Forward collision warning
Information projected on the windscreen
Technology that monitors vehicles in the "blind spot" and alerts the driver.
Warning system to alert the driver to the risk of straying from the lane.
Cruise control that maintains a set distance behind the vehicle in front.
Flashing brake lights during hard braking
Safety cameras
Advanced headlights that follow the curvature of the road as the car turns.
Further-developed HMI (Human Machine Interface)
Height-adjustable rear seat.
Protection for pedestrians
Steering wheel adjustable for height and reach
Passive unlocking and engine starting
Communication with the car via mobile phone

The vehicle was unveiled at the 2001 Detroit Auto Show, and later in Seville International Airport in southern Spain in Autumn. Production model of C30 was planned in 2002.

2006 SEMA concepts (2006)

The Evolve C30 show car has a twin turbo engine, all wheel drive, suspension from Evolve's 2004 S40 concept from the 2004 SEMA show, and 4-piston brake calipers.

The HEICO HS3 THOR is designed for outdoor enthusiasts, built by Heico Sportiv.

The vehicles were unveiled at the 2006 SEMA Show.

2006 Essen concepts (2006)
8.5x20-inch VOLUTION V. wheels in Titan colour, a height-adjustable suspension kit, 4-tip stainless steel exhaust, 4-piston sports brake kit, a pedal set, foot rest, hand-brake lever, and door pins, all in aluminum; seats and door panels in two-tone upholstery.

THOR_2 is a variant of HEICO HS3 THOR concept, based on C30 T5.

The vehicles were unveiled at the 2006 Essen Motor Show. HEICO HS3 D5 went on sale in 2007.

Volvo ReCharge concept (2007)

The ReCharge concept is a plug-in hybrid electric version of the C30, developed by Volvo's California development center. It was unveiled at the 2007 Frankfurt Motor Show. It features a 4-cylinder 1.6L flex-fuel engine and an electric motor on each wheel. The batteries have 3 hours of full recharge time. Volvo plans to sell a production plug-in hybrid C30 in Europe in 2012.

Production version (2006)
A production version of C30 T5 with 160-watt sound system was officially unveiled at the 2006 Paris Motor Show.

Early model includes T5 (2.5 litres), 2.4i, 2.0, 1.8, 1.8 Flexifuel, 1.6, D5 (2.4 litre) (132 kW/180PS), D5 (120 kW/163PS) (Belgium only), 2.0D, 1.6D.

The C30's interior is similar to the S40 and V50; sharing the majority of parts including the instrument panel, 'floating' centre stack and steering wheel.

Europe

In late 2006, the C30 was launched in Europe. Engines choices range from a 1.6L inline-4 (petrol or diesel) to a 2.5L inline-5 turbo (2.4L diesel). 2009 added the choices of a 6-speed PowerShift dual-clutch automatic with the 2.0 L petrol and diesel engines, a 1.8L E85 flex-fuel engine, and 1.6L "DRIVe" diesel engines with improved efficiency and optional start/stop capability.

Trim lines include SE and SE Lux in the UK, and Kinetic, Momentum, and Summum (from fewest to most features) in most other European nations. The R-Design package adds interior and exterior accessories including aluminum inlays on the dashboard, R-Design emblems on the steering wheel, seats and floor mats, a rear spoiler and body kit.

Rivals include the Mini, Alfa Romeo Giulietta, and the Audi A3.

North America
The C30 went on sale in Canada in March 2007 as a 2007 model, and in October 2007 in the United States as a 2008 model.

In Canada, the 2.4i was offered until 2011, while the T5 remained available until the end of production. In the United States, the only engine available was the T5. For 2008, the US C30 debuted with two trim lines, Version 1.0 and Version 2.0. R-Design was added later in the model year, featuring unique badges and interior trim. From 2009 onwards, the US C30 was offered in T5 or R-Design trim. In addition, the Polestar performance option (developed in partnership between Volvo Car Corporation and Polestar) became available for several Volvo models, including 2008 to 2013 C30 T5 (P1 Chassis) models.

Equipment
Available audio systems included:
Performance – with a 4x20W amplifier and six loudspeakers
High Performance – with a 4x40W amplifier and eight loudspeakers
Premium Sound – with a digital class D amplifier with ICE Power technology from Alpine, an output of 5x130W, Dolby Pro Logic II Surround, and ten loudspeakers from Danish Dynaudio
On the High Performance and Premium Sound, it is possible to play CDs with music in MP3 and WMA formats, and they are fitted with an extra AUX connector for connecting auxiliary equipment such as a portable MP3 player. Starting in the spring of 2007, an adapter for connecting an iPod or a USB flash drive will also be available as an accessory.

The 2008 model year brings some minor changes, mostly adapting the interior to the facelifted S40/V50 and including as standard an Aux audio socket.

The 2009 model year moved the Volvo badge from the hatch handle to the glass area above it, enlarged the font and increased the space between the letters. It also brought other small changes such as including the hard load cover as standard.

Polestar Performance Software (2011-2013)
Tuning software for 2008 or later model years C30, C70 and S40 vehicle models with T5 engine went on sale in the US for MSRP of $1,295 starting on 2011-11-14.

Engines and transmissions

Safety
The C30 continues Volvo's marketing strategy to put safety as a primary concern (IntelliSafe). This is demonstrated through some recently developed safety features, including a method of overcoming the "blind spots" in the driver's view to the rear through a system known as BLIS (Blind Spot Information System).

The C30 also features a four-wheel anti-lock braking system (ABS), electronic stability program (ESP), traction control system and front, side and curtain airbags, front and rear crumple zones, and a stiff occupant cell.

The Insurance Institute for Highway Safety (IIHS) awarded the Volvo C30 their Top Safety Pick award. The C30 was granted its highest rating of "good" in front, side, rear and roof strength tests and has Electronic Stability Control as standard equipment to receive the award.

The Volvo C30 has a patented front and rear structure using four different grades of steel to absorb and redistribute impact energy around the body of the coupe. Volvo's Whiplash Protection System and Side Impact Protection System with side airbags and Inflatable Curtain are also standard. The seat belts have pretensioners to protect the occupants against unexpected accidents.

The car also uses Volvo's Intelligent Driver Information System (IDIS) which continuously monitors the car's preemptive systems such as steering wheel angle, pedal depressions, and overall factors that help the vehicle's computer to decide if the driver is busy or distracted merging or turning, and will then accordingly delay certain data or alerts that are unimportant.

The C30 has been criticized because in an effort to make it more responsive in curves it has become less reliable on ice or snow where the rear end can more easily lose its grip compared to other Volvo models.

2010 update

New exterior features include:
Redesigned front, including body panels such as the front wings
New, larger iron mark found in the rest of the Volvo range
Wavier and more dynamic rear
New body colour, Orange Flame Metallic
Visible exhaust tailpipe in the T5 and D5 models
Two new wheel options – and for the first time, white wheels are available
The option to choose five different colours on the lower trim – the C30 Contrast Colour Collection.
New interior features include:
All-new colour combination known as Espresso/Blond, consisting of a dark brown upper section and a blond, fresh shade on the lower door sides. The blond tone is somewhere between grey and beige and is an expression of Volvo's strong Scandinavian design tradition.
Luggage compartment cover in the rear, which uses a new material and a new graphic pattern to further enhance the car's modern image.
Oyster Burst Déco centre stack option
New accessory styling kit includes foglamp décor, a front skidplate, side scuff plates with engraved C30 logo and a rear skidplate with a stylish aluminium look. For D5 and T5 two 90 mm tail pipes in polished stainless steel are added to underline the powerful engine.

Optional sport chassis, available in all models except 1.6D DRIVe, includes lower steering ratio, giving 10% faster response to steering wheel input. Spring stiffness has been increased by no less than 30% in order to increase the car's poise in enthusiastic driving.

In spring 2009, Volvo C30 1.6D DRIVe is available with an advanced start/stop function (as 1.6D DRIVe start/stop).

The updated vehicles were unveiled at the 2009 Frankfurt Motor Show.

The updated C30 went on sale in early 2010, as a 2011 model in North America and Australia. Early models include T5 (2.5 litres), 2.4i, 2.0, 2.0F (Flexifuel), 1.6, D5 (2.4 litres), 2.0D, 1.6D DRIVe, 1.6D DRIVe start/stop. Delivery began in early 2010.

Beginning in 2011 model year, D3 and D4 engine options were added to the product line. Other changes include new body colour (Flamenco Red), Cars with Volvo On Call have the option of activating the cabin heater remotely via SMS text messaging.

Special editions

Volvo C30 Efficiency (2007)

The vehicle was unveiled at the 2007 Frankfurt Motor Show.

Boston Red Sox edition (2008)
The C30 Boston Red Sox edition is a limited (107 units) version of the C30 T5 R-Design with either a five-speed automatic transmission or 6 speed manual transmission with Geartronic for the US market, commemorating Boston Red Sox's 107 victories in 2007. It included red body colour, Boston Red Sox logo at rear hatch glass, Red Sox logo floor mats, and Boston Red Sox fender badges.

C30 R-Design (2008)
The C30 R-Design is a limited (400 units) version of the C30 T5 for the North American market. It included a choice of four body colours (Black Sapphire, Titanium Grey, Orinoco Blue and Passion Red), Sport Body kit, off-black Flex-tech seat upholstery, cushions and backrests trimmed in contrasting crème-colored leather, blue-face instrument cluster, center console with subtle circular patterns and aluminum inlay, wrapped steering with aluminum inlays, sport pedals, sport shifter, floor mats, 18" Atreus wheels, Sirius Satellite Radio with a 6-month introductory subscription. Other options include 5-speed Geartronic transmission, DVD-based navigation system with real time traffic, power driver's seat, Climate Package, power glass moonroof, bi-xenon headlights, Serapis alloy wheels and Dynaudio premium sound system.

The vehicle was unveiled at the 2008 New York Auto Show. Production version went on sale in April 2008.

C30 R-Design (2010-2013)
It is a version of C30 with following:

R-Design badge in the grille
Grille and door mirror housings in special silk metal finish
Body kit with front and rear spoilers, lower door trim moulding and side-skirts colour-matched to the rest of the body, 10 mm reduction in ride height
New 17-inch five-spoke Cratus aluminium wheels (18-inch optional)
Tailgate spoiler
Visible chrome-plated sports tailpipes (90 mm)
Upholstery in two colour combinations: cream-coloured leather with sides in dark grey Flex-Tec, or off-black leather with edges in off-black (new)
Embossed R-Design emblem in the front seats
R-Design centre stack and panel inserts
Gear lever knob trimmed in leather and aluminium
Sports pedals in aluminium, with rubber ribs
Sports steering wheel trimmed in leather, with R-Design emblem
Blue speedometer and rev counter gauges
Textile floor mats with contrasting piping

C30 Black Design (2011)
It is a limited (600 units) version of C30 1.6 D2 (115PS), 1.6 DRIVe (115PS), 2.0 D3 (150PS) or 2.0 (145PS) for Italy market, designed by Eidon and Berman. It included DI-NOC film (3M) carbon fiber surface finish at roof, side frames, the frame of the grille and door mirrors, Fondmetal 17-inch rims in matte black (optional Fondmetal 17-inch rims in matte black), a choice of 5 body colours ( bianco ghiacciato(white), grigio titanio(anthracite), argento electrico metallizzato, orange flame metallizzato (orange flame metallic), argento metallizzato).

2013 C30 Polestar Limited Edition (2012-2013)
The 2013 C30 Polestar Limited Edition is a limited (250 units) version of the C30 T5 R-Design for the US market. It included increase engine power via increasing airflow into the combustion chambers and advancing spark timing, 17-inch Styx alloy wheels in matte black, Polestar badges on the rear and sides of the vehicle, Rebel Blue body colour, leather seating surfaces in a choice of Off-Black or two-tone Off-Black and Calcite colour, C30 T5 R-Design Premium Plus equipment (power glass sunroof, power driver's seat with memory, soft loadcover, auto-dimming rearview mirror with compass, power passenger's seat, LED daytime running lights, Keyless Drive and active dual Xenon headlights), optional Platinum trim (Dolby Pro Logic II Surround Sound, 10 loudspeakers rated 650 watts, navigation system with real time traffic, remote control and map care plus Sirius/XM satellite radio), color-coordinated body kit, front grille R-Design logo, R-Design watch dial instrument cluster, unique aluminum inlays, R-Design sport steering wheel and sport pedals; standard rain sensor windshield wipers and headlight washers, optional Climate Package (heated front seats, Electronic Climate Control (ECC) and Interior Air Quality System (IAQS)), spring stiffness increased by 30 percent, mono-tube design dampers with 20 percent increased low-speed damping, stiffer bushings and a 10-percent-quicker steering ratio.

The vehicle went on sale beginning in October 2012.

C30 Polestar Performance Concept Prototype (2010)
It is a version of C30 inspired by the Polestar STCC race car based on T5, designed by Polestar Performance.

The vehicle was unveiled at the 2010 Gothenburg Motor show.

Range Extenders concepts (2011)
Volvo C30 with series-connected Range Extender is based on C30 Electric with a three-cylinder combustion engine producing  installed under the rear load compartment floor. The car also has a 40-litre fuel tank. The combustion engine is connected to a 40 kW generator. The combined power is used to drive the car's  electric motor, but the driver can also choose to let the generator charge the battery, thus increasing the car's operating range on electricity. This Range Extender increases the electric car's range by up to 1,000 km – on top of the 110 km range provided by the car's battery pack.

The electric motor is same as series-connected Range Extender car. The combined power is rated . This Range Extender increases the electric car's range by up to 1,000 km – on top of the 75 km range provided by the car's battery pack.

Production of fuel cells began in 2010.

C30 DRIVe Electric (2011-2013)

The Volvo C30 Electric was a limited-production battery electric car produced in the mid-2010s.

The prototype C30 electric car used an 82 kW electric motor, and had a 24 kWh lithium-ion battery pack installed in the propshaft tunnel and in the space normally occupied by the fuel tank, outside the passenger compartment and away from the deformations zones. The C30 electric delivers up to  under the NEDC cycle.

A drivable C30 prototype was presented in September 2009. An updated prototype (with complete interior and full instrumentation, and enhanced battery packaging) was unveiled in the 2010 North American International Auto Show.

The C30 DRIVe Electric concept car was exhibited in the 2010 Paris Motor Show and presented as the C30 DRIVe.

Field testing of about 50 C30 electric cars was conducted in Sweden beginning the fourth quarter of 2010, mainly internally at the Volvo Car Corporation. A Volvo C30 Electric was also part of the One Tonne Life project in which a family was given the task of living as climate-smart as possible for a period of six months. In July 2012 Volvo delivered 15 Volvo C30 electric cars as part of an open road test-drive project in Shanghai.

The electric C30 has a 24 kWh lithium-ion battery, supplied by US manufacturer EnerDel. The electric motor, the motor controller, the charger and other drivetrain components were supplied by Swiss manufacturer BRUSA Elektronik AG. Top speed was estimated by Volvo to be , with acceleration from 0–50 km/h (0–31 mph) in 4 seconds. The C30 Electric can be recharged from a regular household power socket and a full charge takes about 7 hours. The batteries are installed where the fuel tank normally sits and also in a special compartment in the C30's central tunnel, and as a result, the luggage compartment is unchanged. In August 2012 Volvo ordered a second supply of battery packs from EnerDel to build an internal test fleet together with Siemens.

The Volvo C30 Electric is equipped with three climate systems: one supplies the passengers with heating or cooling; one cools or warms the battery pack as necessary; and the electric motor and power electronics are water-cooled. The climate control in the passenger cabin features a bioethanol-powered heater, a solution chosen by Volvo to get heating without compromising the battery driving range, but the driver has the option to run the climate unit on electricity from the batteries. Ethanol is the default mode and the ethanol tank can carry  of bio-ethanol. Volvo tested the C30 in winter conditions in temperatures as low as −20 °C (−4 °F) in 2011.

Awards
The C30 DRIVe was one of the five finalists to the 2011 Green Car Vision Award. In July 2012, the Volvo C30 electric was named the "Green Car of the Year" in China at the 4th China New Energy Mobility Summit.

Production
The Volvo C30 Electric body was built on the regular assembly line in the Ghent, Belgium factory, and then the glider is transported to Gothenburg for installation of the motor, batteries and other C30 Electric-specific assemblies.

As a low production car, Volvo intended to lease the Volvo C30 Electric only to corporate customers, mainly companies, authorities and government agencies. Initial deliveries were scheduled for the third quarter of 2011 throughout Europe, including in Sweden, Belgium, the Netherlands and Norway. Volvo planned to build about 250 cars by the end of 2012, and possibly more if market interest occasioned. Volvo also planned to allocate a total of 100 Volvo C30 Electrics for the US, half of which would be offered on the West Coast and the other half on the East Coast. As this pricing was much higher than other electric cars available in the market by 2011, demand was expected to be low, and Volvo explained that their prices reflect the actual cost of the limited-production car. During 2011, 6 units were registered in France. A total of 126 units have been leased in Sweden through September 2012 since 2011. As of July 5, 2013, the C30 was no longer available to order from Volvo, nor did it remain the model line up on the Volvo Cars website. The last C30's from current stock were intended to be registered by the end of 2013, but none were produced after July 2013.

Production of the C30 Electric began in June 2011. Delivery of first ten C30 Electric went to the energy company Göteborg Energi with deliveries starting at the autumn of 2010. Leasing to fleet customers in Sweden, Belgium, the Netherlands and Norway began in the third quarter of 2011. A total of 209 units have been leased in Europe through October 2012, Sweden is the top selling market with 149 units delivered since 2011 through March 2013.

Production ceased in December 2012 and the C30 line was discontinued in 2013.

Marketing
In the 'DRIVe Around the World' C30 DRIVe campaign, a Facebook game was created to challenge users to virtually drive a Volvo C30 DRIVe to a Facebook friend who lives as close to 1,333 kilometres away from Sweden to Egypt as possible. The challenge began in 2009-11-16 and ended in 2010-02-05. The game was promoted with an animated trailer, which received 569,000 views worldwide in 169 countries. The Volvo fan page (www.facebook.com/volvo) was rewarded by a donation from Volvo Cars of 15,000 EURO in the Volvo Fans' team name to a Gold Standard certified wind farm project in Izmir, Turkey.

In the One Tonne Life project, the Lindell family lived in a temporary home from A-hus and drove Volvo C30 Electric. The project house was designed by architect Gert Wingårdh.

Motorsport
Volvo Polestar driver Robert Dahlgren won the 2010 Scandinavian Touring Car Championship. In addition, after 8 of 9 rounds of STCC Driver's Championship 2010, Robert Dahlgren lead the tournament, and Volvo Polestar placed 2nd in the team championship.

Robert Dahlgren won the 2010 STCC Driver's Championship, while Volvo Polestar won the 2010 STCC Team Championship.

In the 2011 World Touring Car Championship season, the Polestar Racing team used Volvo C30 DRIVe as their race car.

In the 2011 FIA WTCC Race of Belgium, Volvo Polestar Racing driver Robert Dahlgren finished the races 1 and 2 in 13th and 7th ranks respectively.

Volvo C30 Electric shared first place in the 130-kilometre Michelin Challenge Bibendum rally plus awards for handling, well to wheel CO2 emissions and local emissions.

Polestar Racing entered 2011 WTCC season with one Volvo C30 DRIVe racer driven by Robert Dahlgren.

In 2011 World Touring Car Championship, Robert Dahlgren crashed out of qualifying in Macau race, ending the Polestar Racing team's season career.

The C30 won 5 races during the 2011 Pirelli World Challenge season.

STCC-Volvo (2010)
It is a race car version of C30 designed for the 2010 Swedish Touring Car Championship.

Marketing
As part of the European C30 launch, a series of 16 different television commercials were created by Fuel London (part of Euro RSCG Worldwide) under the campaign's theme, "A Product of Free Will."

As part of the US C30 launch, Volvo C30's configuration site featured a fluctuating price quote for the identically-equipped vehicles. Volvo's intention was to determine what potential buyers are willing to pay and how many vehicles they should ship to the States.

The Volvo C30 was used in The Twilight Saga.

Sales

See also
Volvo S40
Volvo V50
Volvo C70

Notes

References

External links

 Volvo C30 Dedicated Forum

C30
Coupés
Hatchbacks
Compact cars
Euro NCAP small family cars
Ford C1 platform
Cars introduced in 2006
2010s cars
Front-wheel-drive sports cars
Touring cars